{{DISPLAYTITLE:Glyoxylate reductase (NADP+)}}

In enzymology, a glyoxylate reductase (NADP+) is an enzyme that catalyzes the chemical reaction

glycolate + NADP+  glyoxylate + NADPH + H+

Thus, the two substrates of this enzyme are glycolate and NADP+, whereas its 3 products are glyoxylate, NADPH, and H+.

This enzyme belongs to the family of oxidoreductases, specifically those acting on the CH-OH group of donor with NAD+ or NADP+ as acceptor. The systematic name of this enzyme class is glycolate:NADP+ oxidoreductase. Other names in common use include NADPH-glyoxylate reductase, and glyoxylate reductase (NADP+). This enzyme participates in pyruvate metabolism and glyoxylate and dicarboxylate metabolism.

Structural studies

References

 
 

EC 1.1.1
NADPH-dependent enzymes
Enzymes of known structure